Syed Anwar Raza is a Pakistani politician who had been a Member of the Provincial Assembly of Sindh, from May 2013 to May 2018.

Early life and education

He was born on 10 November 1961 in Karachi.

He has a degree of Bachelor of Arts and a degree of Master of Arts.

Political career

He was elected to the Provincial Assembly of Sindh as a candidate of Mutahida Quami Movement (MQM) from Constituency PS-102 KARACHI-XIV in 2013 Pakistani general election.

In April 2018, he quit MQM and joined Pak Sarzameen Party.

References

Living people
Sindh MPAs 2013–2018
1961 births